The AIM-9 Sidewinder (where "AIM" stands for "Air Intercept Missile") is a short-range air-to-air missile which entered service with the United States Navy in 1956, and subsequently was adopted by the US Air Force in 1964. Since then, the Sidewinder has proved to be an enduring international success, and its latest variants remain standard equipment in most Western-aligned air forces. The Soviet K-13 (AA-2 'Atoll'), a reverse-engineered copy of the AIM-9B, was also widely adopted by a number of nations.

Low-level development started in the late 1940s, emerging in the early 1950s as a guidance system for the modular Zuni rocket. This modularity allowed for the introduction of newer seekers and rocket motors, including the AIM-9C variant, which used semi-active radar homing and served as the basis of the AGM-122 Sidearm anti-radar missile. Originally a tail-chasing system, early models saw extensive use during the Vietnam War but had a low success rate. This led to all-aspect capabilities in the L version which proved to be an extremely effective weapon during combat in the Falklands War and the Operation Mole Cricket 19 ("Bekaa Valley Turkey Shoot") in Lebanon. Its adaptability has kept it in service over newer designs like the AIM-95 Agile and SRAAM that were intended to replace it.

The Sidewinder is the most widely used air-to-air missile in the West, with more than 110,000 missiles produced for the U.S. and 27 other nations, of which perhaps one percent have been used in combat. It has been built under license by some other nations including Sweden, and can even equip helicopters, such as the Bell AH-1Z Viper. The AIM-9 is one of the oldest, lowest cost, and most successful air-to-air missiles, with an estimated 270 aircraft kills in its history of use.

The United States Navy hosted a 50th-anniversary celebration for the Sidewinder in 2002. Boeing won a contract in March 2010 to support Sidewinder operations through to 2055, guaranteeing that the weapons system will remain in operation until at least that date. Air Force Spokeswoman Stephanie Powell noted that due to its relatively low cost, versatility, and reliability it is "very possible that the Sidewinder will remain in Air Force inventories through the late 21st century".

Design 
 
The Sidewinder is not guided by the actual position recorded by the detector, but by the change in position since the last sighting. So if the target remained at 5 degrees left between two rotations of the mirror, the electronics would not output any signal to the control system. Consider a missile fired at right angles to its target; if the missile is flying at the same speed as the target, it should "lead" it by 45 degrees, flying to an impact point far in front of where the target was when it was fired. If the missile is traveling four times the speed of the target, it should follow an angle about 11 degrees in front. In either case, the missile should keep that angle all the way to interception, which means that the angle that the target makes against the detector is constant. It was this constant angle that the Sidewinder attempted to maintain. This "proportional pursuit" system is straightforward to implement and offers high-performance lead calculation almost for free and can respond to changes in the target's flight path, which is much more efficient and makes the missile "lead" the target.

History

Origins 

During World War II, various researchers in Germany designed infrared guidance systems of various complexity. The most mature development of these, codenamed Hamburg, was intended for use by the Blohm & Voss BV 143 glide bomb in an anti-ship role. Hamburg used a single IR photocell as its detector along with a spinning disk with lines painted on it, alternately known as a "reticle" or "chopper". The reticle spun at a fixed speed, causing the output of the photocell to be interrupted in a pattern, and the precise timing of the resulting signal indicated the bearing of the target. Although Hamburg and similar devices like Madrid were essentially complete, the work of mating them to a missile had not been carried out by the time the war ended.

In the immediate post-war era, Allied military intelligence teams collected this information, along with many of the engineers working on these projects. Several lengthy reports on the various systems were produced and disseminated among the western aircraft firms, while a number of the engineers joined these companies to work on various missile projects. By the late 1940s a wide variety of missile projects were underway, from huge systems like the Bell Bomi rocket-powered bomber to small systems like air-to-air missiles. By the early 1950s, both the US Air Force and Royal Air Force had started major IR seeker missile projects.

The development of the Sidewinder missile began in 1946 at the Naval Ordnance Test Station (NOTS), Inyokern, California, now the Naval Air Weapons Station China Lake, as an in-house research project conceived by William B. McLean. McLean initially called his effort "Local Fuze Project 602" using laboratory funding, volunteer help and fuze funding to develop what they called a heat-homing rocket. The name Sidewinder was selected in 1950 and is the common name of Crotalus cerastes, a rattlesnake, which uses infrared sensory organs to hunt warm-blooded prey.

It did not receive official funding until 1951 when the effort was mature enough to show to Admiral William "Deak" Parsons, the Deputy Chief of the Bureau of Ordnance (BuOrd). It subsequently received designation as a program in 1952. Originally called the Sidewinder 1, the first live firing was on 3 September 1952. The missile intercepted a drone for the first time on 11 September 1953. The missile carried out 51 guided flights in 1954, and in 1955 production was authorized.

In 1954, the US Air Force carried out trials with the original AIM-9A and the improved AIM-9B at the Holloman Air Development Center. The first operational use of the missile was by Grumman F9F-8 Cougars and FJ-3 Furies of the United States Navy in the middle of 1956.

First Generation Rear-Aspect Variants 
Nearly 100,000 of the first generation (AIM-9B/C/D/E) of the Sidewinder were produced with Raytheon and General Electric as major sub-contractors. Philco-Ford produced the guidance and control sections of the early missiles. The NATO version of the first generation missile was built under license in Germany by Bodenseewerk Gerätetechnik; 9,200 examples were built.

Combat debut: Taiwan Strait, 1958 
The first combat use of the Sidewinder was on 24 September 1958, with the Republic of China (Taiwan) Air Force, during the Second Taiwan Strait Crisis. During that period of time, ROCAF North American F-86 Sabres were routinely engaged in air battles with the People's Republic of China over the Taiwan Strait. The PRC MiG-17s had higher altitude ceiling performance and in similar fashion to Korean War encounters between the F-86 and earlier MiG-15, the PRC formations cruised above the ROC Sabres, immune to their .50 cal weaponry and only choosing battle when conditions favored them.

In a highly secret effort, the United States provided a few dozen Sidewinders to ROC forces and an Aviation Ordnance Team from the U.S. Marine Corps to modify their aircraft to carry the Sidewinder. In the first encounter on 24 September 1958, the Sidewinders were used to ambush the MiG-17s as they flew past the Sabres thinking they were invulnerable to attack. The MiGs broke formation and descended to the altitude of the Sabres in swirling dogfights. This action marked the first successful use of air-to-air missiles in combat, the downed MiGs being their first casualties.

During the Taiwan Strait battles of 1958, a ROCAF AIM-9B hit a PLAAF MiG-17 without exploding; the missile lodged in the airframe of the MiG and allowed the pilot to bring both plane and missile back to base. Soviet engineers later said that the captured Sidewinder served as a "university course" in missile design and substantially improved Soviet air-to-air capabilities. They were able to reverse-engineer a copy of the Sidewinder, which was manufactured as the Vympel K-13/R-3S missile, NATO reporting name AA-2 Atoll.
The Vympel K-13 entered service with Soviet air forces in 1960.

Vietnam War service 1965–1973 
Performance of the 454 Sidewinders launched during the war was not as satisfactory as hoped. Both the USN and USAF studied the performance of their aircrews, aircraft, weapons, training, and supporting infrastructure. The USAF conducted the classified Red Baron Report while the Navy conducted a study concentrating primarily on performance of air-to-air weapons that was informally known as the "Ault Report". The impact of both studies resulted in modifications to the Sidewinder by both services to improve its performance and reliability in the demanding air-to-air arena.

Vietnam War AIM-9 claimed aerial combat kills 

In total 452 Sidewinders were fired during the Vietnam War, resulting in a kill probability of 0.18.

Note: the speed of the B model was around 1.7 Mach and the other models above 2.5.

Later Generation All-aspect variants

AIM-9L 

The next major advance in IR Sidewinder development was the AIM-9L ("Lima") model which was in full production in 1977. This was the first "all-aspect" Sidewinder with the ability to attack from all directions, including head-on, which had a dramatic effect on close-in combat tactics. Its first combat use was by a pair of US Navy F-14s in the Gulf of Sidra in 1981 versus two Libyan Sukhoi Su-22s, both of the latter being destroyed by AIM-9Ls. Its first use in a large-scale conflict was by the United Kingdom during the 1982 Falklands War. In this campaign the "Lima" reportedly achieved kills from 80% of launches, a dramatic improvement over the 10–15% levels of earlier versions, scoring 17 kills and 2 shared kills against Argentine aircraft.

AIM-9M 
The AIM-9M is an improved AIM-9L having better background rejection and infrared countermeasures discrimination, and a low-smoke motor to reduce the visual signature of the weapon. Deployed in large numbers during the 1991 Gulf War, the AIM-9M was responsible for all 10 Sidewinder kills recorded during that conflict.

BOA/Box Office 
China Lake developed an improved compressed carriage control configuration titled BOA. "Compressed carriage" missiles have smaller control surfaces to allow more missiles to fit in a given space. The surfaces may be permanently "clipped", or may fold out when the missile is launched.

AIM-9X 
Hughes Electronics was awarded a contract for development of the AIM-9X Sidewinder in 1996 after a competition against Raytheon for the next short-range aerial combat missile, though Raytheon purchased the defense portions of Hughes Electronics the following year.  The AIM-9X entered service in November 2003 with the USAF (the lead platform was the F-15C) and the USN (the lead platform was the F/A-18C) and is a substantial upgrade to the Sidewinder family featuring an imaging infrared focal-plane array (FPA) seeker with claimed 90° off-boresight capability, compatibility with helmet-mounted displays such as the new U.S. Joint Helmet Mounted Cueing System (JHMCS), and a totally new two-axis thrust-vectoring control (TVC) system providing increased turn capability over traditional control surfaces (60Gs). Utilizing the JHMCS, a pilot can point the AIM-9X missile's seeker and "lock on" by simply looking at a target, thereby increasing air combat effectiveness. It retains the same rocket motor, fuze and warhead of the AIM-9M, but its lower drag gives it improved range and speed. The AIM-9X also includes an internal cooling system, eliminating the need for use of launch-rail nitrogen bottles (U.S. Navy and Marines) or internal argon bottles (USAF). It also features an electronic safe and arm device similar to the AMRAAM, allowing for a reduction in minimum range, and reprogrammable infrared Counter Counter Measures (IRCCM) capability that coupled with the FPA provides improved look down into clutter and performance against the latest IRCM. Though not part of the original requirement, the AIM-9X demonstrated potential for lock-on after launch capability, allowing for possible internal use for the F-35, F-22 Raptor and even in a submarine-launched configuration for use against ASW platforms. The AIM-9X has been tested for a surface attack capability, with mixed results.

Block II 
Testing work on the AIM-9X Block II version began in September 2008. The Block II adds lock-on after launch capability with a datalink, so the missile can be launched first and then directed to its target afterwards by an aircraft with the proper equipment for 360-degree engagements, such as the F-35 or the F-22. By January 2013, the AIM-9X Block II was about halfway through its operational testing and performing better than expected. NAVAIR reported that the missile was exceeding performance requirements in all areas, including lock-on after launch (LOAL). One area where the Block II needs improvement is helmetless high off-boresight (HHOBS) performance. It is functioning well on the missile, but performance is below that of the Block I AIM-9X. The HHOBS deficiency does not impact any other Block II capabilities, and is planned to be improved upon by a software clean-up build. Objectives of the operational test were due to be completed by the third quarter of 2013. However, as of May 2014 there have been plans to resume operational testing and evaluation (including surface-to-air missile system compatibility). , Raytheon had delivered 5,000 AIM-9X missiles to the armed services. On 18 June 2017, after an AIM-9X did not successfully track a targeted Syrian Air Force Su-22 Fitter, US Navy Lt. Cmdr. Michael “Mob” Tremel flying a F/A-18E Super Hornet used an AMRAAM AAM to successfully destroy the enemy aircraft. There is a theory that the Sidewinder is tested against American and not Soviet/Russian flares. The Sidewinder is used to rejecting American but not Soviet/Russian flares. Similar issues arose from the testing of the AIM-9P model. The missile would ignore American flares but go for Soviet ones due to these flares have "different burn time, intensity and separation."

In February 2015, the U.S. Army successfully launched an AIM-9X Block II from the new Multi-Mission Launcher (MML), a truck-mounted missile launch container that can hold 15 of the missiles. The MML is part of the Indirect Fire Protection Capability Increment 2-Intercept (IFPC Inc. 2-I) to protect ground forces against cruise missile and unmanned aerial vehicle threats. The AIM-9X Block II has been determined by the Army to be the best solution to cruise missile and UAV threats because of its passive imaging infrared seeker. The MML will complement the AN/TWQ-1 Avenger air defense system and is expected to begin fielding in 2019.

Block III 
In September 2012, Raytheon was ordered to continue developing the Sidewinder into a Block III variant, even though the Block II had not yet entered service. The USN projected that the new missile would have a 60 percent longer range, modern components to replace old ones, and an insensitive munitions warhead, which is more stable and less likely to detonate by accident, making it safer for ground crews. The need for the AIM-9 to have an increased range was caused by digital radio frequency memory (DRFM) jammers that can blind the onboard radar of an AIM-120D AMRAAM, so the Sidewinder Block III's passive imaging infrared homing guidance system was seen as a useful alternative. Although it could supplement the AMRAAM for beyond visual range (BVR) engagements, it would still be capable of performing within visual range (WVR). Modifying the AIM-9X was seen as a cost-effective alternative to developing a new missile in a time of declining budgets. To achieve the range increase, the rocket motor would have a combination of increased performance and missile power management. The Block III would "leverage" the Block II's guidance unit and electronics, including the AMRAAM-derived datalink. The Block III was scheduled to achieve initial operational capability (IOC) in 2022, following the increased number of F-35 Lightning II Joint Strike Fighters to enter service. The Navy pressed for this upgrade in response to a projected threat which analysts have speculated will be due to the difficulty of targeting upcoming Chinese fifth-generation jet fighters (Chengdu J-20, Shenyang J-31) with the radar-guided AMRAAM, specifically that Chinese advances in electronics will mean Chinese fighters will use their AESA radars as jammers to degrade the AIM-120's kill probability. However, the Navy's FY 2016 budget cancelled the AIM-9X Block III as they cut down buys of the F-35C, as it was primarily intended to permit the fighter to carry six BVR missiles; the insensitive munition warhead will be retained for the AIM-9X program.

2023 North American balloon & unidentified object shootdowns
Six days later, another object was shot down near Alaska. On 11 and 12 February two more objects were shot down, over Yukon, Canada and Lake Huron in Michigan respectively.

Sidewinder descendants

Anti-tank variant 

Naval Air Weapons Station China Lake experimented with Sidewinders in the air-to-ground mode including use as an anti-tank weapon.
Starting from 2008, the AIM-9X demonstrated its ability as a successful light air-to-ground missile.

In 2016 Diehl closed a deal with the Federal Office of Bundeswehr Equipment, Information Technology and In-Service Support to develop a laser guided Air-To-Ground variant of the Sidewinder missile based on the AIM-9L variant. In testing with the Swedish Defence Materiel Administration a Saab Gripen could hit one stationary and two moving targets.

On 28 February 2018, the Iranian Islamic Revolutionary Guard Corps unveiled an anti-tank derivative of the Sidewinder missile named "Azarakhsh" intended for use by Bell AH-1J SeaCobra attack helicopters.

Later developments

Larger rocket motor 
Under the High Altitude Project, engineers at China Lake mated a Sidewinder warhead and seeker to a Sparrow rocket motor to experiment with usefulness of a larger motor.

Other ground launch platforms 
In 2016 the AIM-9X was test fired from a Multi-Mission Launcher at the White Sands Missile Range in New Mexico, USA. During testing with the MML, the AIM-9X experienced issues with overheating. These issues have since been resolved. In September 2021, the U.S. Army signed a contract with Dynetics to build prototypes for its Indirect Fires Protection Capability (IFPC), utilizing an MML-based launcher firing the Sidewinder to counter UAVs and cruise missiles. It is planned to be put into service in 2023.

In May 2019 the AIM-9X Block II was test fired from the National Advanced Surface to Air Missile System (NASAMS) at the Andøya Space Center in Norway.

Operators

Current operators 

  AIM-9L/M
 
 
 
 
 
 
 
 
 
 
 
 
 
 
 
 
 
 
 
 
  Kenya
 
 
 
 
 
 
 
 
 
  AIM-9B/J/P/L/M/9X Block II

Former operators 

 
 
 
 
 
 
 
 
 
 
 
 

Please note that this list is not definitive.

See also

Comparable missiles

 ASRAAM
 A-Darter 
 IRIS-T
 MAA-1 Piranha
 MICA
 R.550 Magic
 Red Top
 Firestreak
 PL-9
 Python 5
R-60
 R-73
 Shafrir
 Fatter
 AAM-1/3/5

References

Notes

Citations

Bibliography 
 Babcock, Elizabeth (1999). Sidewinder – Invention and Early Years. The China Lake Museum Foundation. 26 pp. A concise record of the development of the original Sidewinder version and the central people involved in its design.
 Bonds, Ray ed. The Modern US War Machine. New York City: Crown Publishers, 1989. .
 
 
 
 
 
 
 McCarthy, Donald J. Jr. MiG Killers, A Chronology of U.S. Air Victories in Vietnam 1965–1973. 2009, Specialty Press, North Branch, MN, U.S.A. 
 Michel III, Marshall L. Clashes, Air Combat Over North Vietnam 1965–1972. 1997.  .
 Westrum, Ron (1999). "Sidewinder—Creative missile development at China Lake." Naval Institute Press.

External links 

 
 Defense Industry Daily – AIM-9X Block II: The New Sidewinder Missile
 Encyclopædia Britannica
 Raytheon AAM-N-7/GAR-8/AIM-9 Sidewinder – Designation Systems
 The Sidewinder Story
 Sidewinder at Howstuffworks.com
 NAMMO Raufoss – Nordic Ammunition Company
 
 
 "Fox Two!" from Aviation History magazine, March 2013. Includes photos & video 
 Italy signs up for Aim-9x

Cold War air-to-air missiles of the United States
Raytheon Company products
Military equipment introduced in the 1950s
Infrared technology
Fire-and-forget weapons